Javier Fernández Abruñedo (born 20 February 1996), most known as Bicho, is a Spanish footballer who plays for Compostela as an attacking midfielder.

Club career
Born in Sada, Galicia, Bicho was a youth product of local Deportivo de La Coruña. He made his debuts as a senior with the reserves, representing the side in Tercera División.

Bicho made his official debut for the Galicians' first team on 17 August 2013, playing the last 3 minutes in a 1–0 away win over UD Las Palmas. He spent the remainder of the campaign appearing with the B-side, however.

On 14 July 2014 Bicho joined another reserve team, FC Barcelona B in a two-year loan deal. On 31 August of the following year he was loaned to CD Leganés, for one year. Bicho left Deportivo at the end of the 2018-19 season.

Career statistics

Club

References

External links
 
 
 

1996 births
Living people
Sportspeople from the Province of A Coruña
People from A Coruña (comarca)
Spanish footballers
Footballers from Galicia (Spain)
Association football midfielders
Segunda División players
Segunda División B players
Tercera División players
Deportivo Fabril players
Deportivo de La Coruña players
FC Barcelona Atlètic players
CD Leganés players
SD Compostela footballers
Racing de Ferrol footballers
Spain youth international footballers